Antispila nolckeni is a moth of the family Heliozelidae. It was described by Philipp Christoph Zeller in 1877. It is found in Colombia.

References

Moths described in 1877
Heliozelidae